This article lists all power stations in Cambodia.

Coal

Hydroelectric

Solar 
Projects above 5 MW, as of 2021:

See also 
 Energy in Cambodia

References 

Cambodia
Power stations in Cambodia
Power stations